Hazelyn Francis (born 1939) is a former politician, teacher, trade-union leader from Antigua and Barbuda, Vice-President and President of the Senate in Antigua and Barbuda from 2005 to 2014.

Francis served as president of the Antigua and Barbuda Union of Teachers from 1995 to 1998. On 27 March 2004 she was appointed to the Senate. She served as Vice-President of the Senate in 2004–05, and was elected President of the Senate on 7 January 2005.

On 28 October 2005, she was violently attacked, robbed, and raped in her home, and was briefly hospitalised as a result. 
The incident served to intensify the debate around high levels of crime and prompted a review of security arrangements for government officials.

References

1939 births
Presidents of the Senate (Antigua and Barbuda)
Antigua and Barbuda victims of crime
Living people
Antigua and Barbuda women in politics
Antigua and Barbuda educators
21st-century women politicians
United Progressive Party (Antigua and Barbuda) politicians